Metzneria diffusella is a moth of the family Gelechiidae. It is found in Russia (the southern Ural), France, Spain, Italy, Croatia, Bulgaria and the Near East
(Syria).

References

Moths described in 1974
Metzneria
Moths of Europe